The Men's 100m T13 event at the 2016 Summer Paralympics took place at the Estádio Olímpico João Havelange in Rio de Janeiro between 8–9 September.

Ireland's Jason Smyth won the gold medal for the third consecutive Games, after Beijing 2008 and London 2012. Johannes Nambala from Namibia finished second and Australia's Chad Perris won the bronze medal.

Results

Heats
Qualification rule: First 3 in each heat (Q) and the next two fastest (q) advance to the final.

Heat 1

Heat 2

Final

References

External links
 Heats
 Final

Athletics at the 2016 Summer Paralympics
2016 in men's athletics